Saint-Romphaire is a former commune in the Manche department in Normandy in north-western France. On 1 January 2016, it was merged into the new commune of Bourgvallées. Its population was 760 in 2019.

It is named after the 6th-century Saint .

See also
Communes of the Manche department

References

Saintromphaire
Manche communes articles needing translation from French Wikipedia